Norman Whitfield (3 April 1896 – 14 November 1962) was an English professional footballer who played as an inside left in the Football League for Chesterfield and Leicester City. He later captained Nuneaton Town in non-League football.

Personal life 
Whitfield served as a gunner in the Royal Garrison Artillery during the First World War and was wounded during the course of his service.

Honours 
Nuneaton Town
 Tamworth Charity Cup: 1928–29, 1929–30
 Nuneaton Hospitals Cup: 1928–29
 Nuneaton Charity Cup: 1928–29, 1929–30
 Chapel End Nursing Cup: 1929–30
 Atherstone Nursing Cup: 1929–30

Career statistics

References 

1896 births
People from Prudhoe
Footballers from Northumberland
English footballers
Association football inside forwards
English Football League players
British Army personnel of World War I
1962 deaths
Royal Garrison Artillery soldiers
Jarrow F.C. players
Leicester City F.C. players
Hednesford Town F.C. players
Chesterfield F.C. players
Nuneaton Borough F.C. players
Hinckley United F.C. players
Newcastle United F.C. wartime guest players
Military personnel from Northumberland